The Cesano Infantry Shooting Range was a temporary firing range set up by the Italian Army for the infantry off the Via Cassia. It hosted the 300 m free rifle shooting event for the 1960 Summer Olympics in Rome.

References
1960 Summer Olympics official report. Volume 1. pp. 66–7.
1960 Summer Olympics official report. Volume 2. Part 2. p. 932.
Roma1960.it venue profile.

Venues of the 1960 Summer Olympics
Olympic shooting venues
Defunct sports venues in Italy